Katrine Fruelund (born 12 July 1978 in Randers, Midtjylland) is a former Danish team handball player and two times Olympic champion. She received gold medals with the Danish national team at the 2000 Summer Olympics in Sydney and at the 2004 Summer Olympics in Athens. She stopped her career in June 2012.

Achievements

Club

 Damehåndboldligaen:
Winner: 2000, 2001, 2002, 2004, 2012
Silver Medalist: 2010, 2011
Landspokalturneringen:
Winner: 2003
Bundesliga:
Winner: 2006
DHB-Pokal:
Winner: 2006
EHF Cup:
Winner: 2004, 2010
EHF Champions League:
Finalist: 2001

International

Olympic Games:
Winner: 2000, 2004
European Championship:
Winner: 2002
Silver Medalist: 1998

References

External links
 Profile on Randers HK official website

1978 births
Living people
People from Randers
Danish female handball players
Olympic gold medalists for Denmark
Handball players at the 2000 Summer Olympics
Handball players at the 2004 Summer Olympics
Viborg HK players
Olympic medalists in handball
Medalists at the 2004 Summer Olympics
Medalists at the 2000 Summer Olympics
Sportspeople from the Central Denmark Region